Coto 47 Airport  is an airport serving Coto 47, a community among the oil palm plantations in Puntarenas Province, Costa Rica.

The Coto 47 non-directional beacon (Ident: COT) is located on the field.

The airport is accessible to locations such as Pavones, Sabalos, Neily (es) and Playa Zancudo. A scheduled bus, the Finca 40, leaves for Neily daily, and there are also many taxis available for transport to other locations.

Airlines and destinations

See also

Transport in Costa Rica
List of airports in Costa Rica

References

External links
OurAirports - Coto 47
SkyVector - Coto 47
OpenStreetMap - Coto 47

Airports in Costa Rica
Buildings and structures in Puntarenas Province